Sean O'Connor (born October 19, 1981) is a Canadian professional ice hockey player currently an unrestricted free agent who most recently was under contract with the Straubing Tigers in the Deutsche Eishockey Liga (DEL).

Career 
O'Connor was originally selected by the Florida Panthers in the third round (82nd overall) of the 2000 NHL Entry Draft.

He previously played in Germany for Augsburger Panther, ERC Ingolstadt, and the Schwenninger Wild Wings . On March 10, 2015, O'Connor signed as a free agent with his fifth DEL club, the Straubing Tigers on a one-year deal.

Career statistics

References

External links

1981 births
Living people
Augsburger Panther players
Augusta Lynx players
Canadian ice hockey right wingers
Cincinnati Mighty Ducks players
ERC Ingolstadt players
Florida Panthers draft picks
Ice hockey people from British Columbia
Sportspeople from Victoria, British Columbia
Jackson Bandits players
Las Vegas Wranglers players
Moose Jaw Warriors players
EHC München players
Ontario Reign (ECHL) players
Phoenix RoadRunners players
San Antonio Rampage players
San Diego Gulls (ECHL) players
Schwenninger Wild Wings players
Straubing Tigers players
Victoria Salmon Kings players
Victoria Salsa players
Canadian expatriate ice hockey players in Germany